Admiral Francis Munroe Ramsay (April 5, 1835 – July 19, 1914) was an officer in the United States Navy who distinguished himself in the American Civil War, and who later served as Chief of the Navy's Bureau of Navigation.

Early life and career
Born in the District of Columbia, Ramsay was appointed midshipman on October 5, 1850.

Civil War service
In that gunboat, he participated in Yazoo River operations during April and May. Then on June 7, he supported a Union garrison at Milliken's Bend, Louisiana in holding off some 4,000 Confederate troops. Moving on to Vicksburg, he commanded a battery of heavy guns mounted on scows in exposed positions before the city, June 19 – July 4. After the capture of the river stronghold, he was given command of the 3d Division, Mississippi Squadron.

During February and March 1864, he led expeditions up the Black and Ouachita Rivers and from mid-March to early May participated in Rear Admiral David Dixon Porter's expedition up the Red River.

He participated in the amphibious assaults on Fort Fisher December 24, 1864 and on January 13, 1865, and in subsequent attacks against Fort Anderson and other forts along the Cape Fear River. In April, he assisted in removing torpedoes (mines) from the James River and was present at the capture of Richmond.

Post-Civil War service
Ashore, he served at the Naval Academy, at Newport, in London as naval attaché, and at Boston and New York as commandant of the Navy Yards. In 1889 he became Chief of the Bureau of Navigation and remained in that post until his retirement April 5, 1897.

He was promoted to rear admiral on April 5, 1894, and died in Washington, D.C. July 19, 1914.

Legacy
In 1918, the destroyer  was named in his honor.

See also

List of Superintendents of the United States Naval Academy

References

1835 births
1914 deaths
United States Navy admirals
United States Naval Academy alumni
Union Navy officers
People from Washington, D.C.
Superintendents of the United States Naval Academy